Barda or BARDA may refer to:

Geography
Barda District, a district in Azerbaijan
Barda, Azerbaijan, a town in Azerbaijan
Bârda, a village in Malovăț Commune, Mehedinți County, Romania
Barda, Russia, several rural localities in Russia
Barda Village, Haryana, a village in India; birthplace of Richhpal Ram, an Indian recipient of the Victoria Cross
Barda (river), a river in Perm Krai, Russia
Barda, Purba Medinipur, a census town in Sutahata CD block, Purba Medinipur district, West Bengal, India

People
Arvīds Bārda (1901–1940), Latvian association football player
Clive Barda (born 1945), British photographer
Edvīns Bārda (1900–1947), Latvian association football player and manager
Elyaniv Barda (born 1981), Israeli association football player
Franciszek Barda (1880–1964), Polish clergyman
Fricis Bārda (1880–1919), Latvian poet
Henri Barda, French classical pianist
Jean-Pierre Barda (born 1967), Swedish pop singer
Michal Barda (born 1955), Czech Olympic handball player and coach
Nissim Barda, Israeli former association football player
Olaf Barda (1909–1971), Norwegian chess player
Oskars Bārda, brother of Arvīds, Edvīns, and Rūdolfs Bārda
Rūdolfs Bārda (1903–1991), Latvian association football player
Saidu Barda, Nigerian politician
Yinon Barda (born 1984), Israeli association football player
Yngvar Barda (1935–1999), Norwegian chess player

Other
Barda, alternative name for the Bardi people, an Indigenous Australian people 
Barda, alternative name for the Bardi language, language of the Bardi people 
Barda tribe one of the scheduled tribes of India
Barda Wildlife Sanctuary, a wildlife sanctuary in Gujarat, India
Barda Mausoleum, a mausoleum in Azerbaijan
Barda, Turkish name of At the Bar, a 2007 Turkish horror movie
Barda, a fictional character in the Deltora saga
BARDA, the Biomedical Advanced Research and Development Authority, a U.S. government agency
ABN Bärdä, Azerbaijani association football club

See also
Bardas (disambiguation)
Big Barda, a DC Comics character and member of the New Gods
Little Barda, a related character to DC's Big Barda